Prom Night is a 2008 slasher film directed by Nelson McCormick. It is a reboot of the Prom Night film series and its fifth installment, mainly taking inspiration from the original 1980 film. The film stars an ensemble cast including Brittany Snow, Scott Porter, Jessica Stroup, Dana Davis, Collins Pennie, Kelly Blatz, James Ransone, Brianne Davis, Johnathon Schaech, and Idris Elba. The film received generally negative reviews, and was a financial failure, grossing $57.2 million against a $20 millon budget.

Plot 
High school freshman Donna Keppel returns home one evening to find her father and younger brother have been murdered. She hides under her bed where she then witnesses her mother stabbed to death by Richard Fenton, her former biology teacher who has become obsessed with Donna.

Three years later, Donna lives with her Uncle Jack and Aunt Karen. She and her friends prepare for their senior prom. Meanwhile, Detective Winn, who imprisoned Fenton three years later  , learns Fenton has escaped from prison and will stop at nothing to have his reunion with Donna. 

Knowing Fenton will come for Donna, Winn arrives at the hotel with his partner Detective Nash. Donna's friend Lisa and her boyfriend Ronnie bump into Fenton on their way up to their room; Lisa recognizes him but does not know where she has seen him before. Soon after, she realizes it’s the assailant and flees the room to warn Donna, only to be trapped in the stairwell by the assailant. He chases her into the basement where he finds her and slits her throat.

Winn finds the body of the real Howard Ramsey in his car trunk in the parking lot. He then goes up to the room booked under Ramsey's name and finds the housekeeper's body. He sounds the emergency alarm and has the hotel evacuated. Donna quickly goes back up to her room to retrieve her mother's shawl, but runs into Fenton. After a short altercation, Donna escapes. Winn orders the SWAT team to search the hotel, but they find no sign of Fenton.

Donna and her boyfriend Bobby are escorted back to Donna's house, where Winn orders back up to keep Fenton away. Inside, Donna experiences a bad dream and awakens suddenly. She then discovers Bobby is dead after having his throat slashed. She sees a shadow in the hallway and retreats to her closet to hide, only to find it is Winn coming upstairs. Before she can leave, the intruder appears in the closet and prepares to kidnap her. Donna begins to fight him and a violent struggle ensues. As Fenton is about to stab Donna, Winn returns and shoots Fenton several times in the chest, killing him.

As Donna mourns over Bobby's body and is joined by her Aunt and Uncle, Winn consoles her and tells her it is finally over.

Cast

Production 
The film was originally announced in 2004 with the script being written by Stephen Susco. The final script was written by J. S. Cardone. The budget for the film was $20 million. It was produced by Original Film and Newmarket Films in association with Alliance Films, which holds the rights to the original franchise, along with sequel rights.

The film was mostly shot in Los Angeles, with overhead shots taking place in Newport, Oregon.

Release 
Prom Night was released by Sony Pictures and Screen Gems.  The film grossed $20,804,941 in 2,700 theaters in the United States and Canada, ranking #1 at the box office in its opening weekend and averaging $7,705 per theater. It grossed $43,869,350 in the U.S. and a $12,728,210 in other territories for a worldwide total of $56,597,560.

Reception 
Upon its release, Prom Night was universally panned by critics. Rotten Tomatoes gives the film an approval rating of 9% based on 68 reviews. The critical consensus states: "A dim and predictable remake of an already dull slasher film, this Prom Night fails to be memorable." On Metacritic, the film has an average score of 17 out of 100 based on 12 reviews, indicating "overwhelming dislike".

Mark Olsen of the Los Angeles Times wrote: "This is as listless, mindless and utterly useless a piece of corporate brain-clog as one is likely to come across for quite some time."

Home media 
The DVD and Blu-ray Disc was released on August 19, 2008 in theatrical (88 minutes) and unrated (89 minutes) versions. Both formats contain deleted scenes and an alternate ending. It was released in Australia on Blu-ray and 2 Disc DVD Edition on August 27, 2008. In F.Y.E. stores in the U.S., the unrated edition came with a bonus disc called "Body Count: Investigating the Murders of Prom Night," a 22-minute documentary about the murders of various characters in the film, as well as various techniques the director used to make the murders scarier. The home media release also includes interviews with Nelson McCormick (director) and other members of the cast of the film.

References

External links 
 
 
 
 
 
 

Prom Night (film series)
2008 films
2008 horror films
2000s American films
2000s Canadian films
2000s English-language films
2000s high school films
2000s slasher films
2000s teen horror films
American high school films
American remakes of Canadian films
American slasher films
American teen horror films
Canadian high school films
Canadian slasher films
English-language Canadian films
Films about proms
Films about stalking
Films directed by Nelson McCormick
Films scored by Paul Haslinger
Films set in 2005
Films set in 2008
Films shot in Los Angeles
Films shot in Oregon
Horror film remakes
Newmarket films
Original Film films
Screen Gems films
Reboot films